Ercan Aktuna (1 January 1940 – 20 September 2013) was a Turkish footballer who played as a defender for Fenerbahçe and İstanbulspor.

Aktuna started his career in 1957 at İstanbulspor, then transferred to Fenerbahçe in 1965. He won five Turkish League titles in ten years. He also played 29 times for Turkey. He ended his career with Fenerbahçe jersey in 1975.

On 20 September 2013, Ercan Aktuna died in Istanbul, aged 73.

References

External links
 

1940 births
2013 deaths
Turkish footballers
Association football defenders
Turkey international footballers
Fenerbahçe S.K. footballers
İstanbulspor footballers
Fenerbahçe football managers
Turkish football managers